Aarón Wergifker (August 15, 1914 – June 29, 1994) was a Brazil-born, naturalized Argentine  football defender. Wergifker was the first Jew to play for the Argentina national football team.

Career
Born in São Paulo, Wergifker moved to Argentina shortly after birth and started his career playing for Club Atlético River Plate from 1932 to 1941 and Club Atlético Platense from 1942 to 1946. He also played for the Argentina national team, appearing in four matches from 1934 to 1936.

References

External links
 Matías Rodríguez: Figurita Difícil: Aarón Wergifker, El Gráfico, 2014-02-14.
 Aarón Wergifker at BDFA.com.ar 
 Aaron Wergifker Football Player Statistics, 11v11.com.

1914 births
1994 deaths
Jewish Argentine sportspeople
Jewish footballers
Brazilian footballers
Brazilian emigrants to Argentina
Naturalized citizens of Argentina
Brazilian Jews
Argentine Jews
Argentine footballers
Argentina international footballers
Club Atlético River Plate footballers
Club Atlético Platense footballers
Argentine Primera División players
Expatriate footballers in Argentina
Association football defenders
Footballers from São Paulo